Beautiful mabuya of four-lined mabuya (Eutropis quadricarinata} is a species of skink. It was previously assigned to the genus Mabuya, but following splitting up of this genus, the beautiful mabuya was assigned to the genus Eutropis.
Distribution: India, Myanmar
Type locality: Bhamo and hills to the east

References

 Boulenger,G.E. 1887 An account of the Scincoid lizards collected from Burma for the Genoa Civic Museum by Messrs. G.B. Comotto and L. Fea. Ann. Mus. Civ. Genova (2) 4: 618-624

Eutropis
Reptiles described in 1887
Taxa named by George Albert Boulenger